The River Sett is a river that flows through the High Peak borough of Derbyshire, in north western England. It rises near Edale Cross on Kinder Scout and flows through the villages of Hayfield and Birch Vale to join the  River Goyt at New Mills. The River Goyt is one of the principal tributaries of the River Mersey. In the past, the river was known as the River Kinder; the modern River Kinder is a right tributary of the Sett, joining the river at Bowden Bridge above Hayfield.

The 2.5-mile Sett Valley Trail follows the trackbed of the former railway line along the valley between Hayfield and New Mills.

The river's Environment Agency pollution classification changed from good to moderate in 2014.

Tributaries
Dimpus Clough (L)
Coldwell Clough (R)
Tunstead Clough (R)
Hidebank Brook ? (L)
Thornsett/Rowarth Brook ? (R)
Gibb Brook ? (L)
Raens Brook (L)
Birch Hall Brook ? (L)
Hollingworth Clough ? (R)
Middle Brook ? (L)
Phoside Brook ? (L)
Foxholes Clough (L)
Hazlehurst Brook (L)
River Kinder (R)
Upper Brook ? (L)
William Clough ? (R)
Blackshaws Brook ? (L)
Red Brook (L)
Oaken Clough (R)

See also 
List of mills on the River Sett

References

Sett, River
Sett
1Sett
High Peak, Derbyshire